Mills & Boon is a romance imprint of British publisher Harlequin UK Ltd. It was founded in 1908 by Gerald Rusgrove Mills and Charles Boon as a general publisher. The company moved towards escapist fiction for women in the 1930s. In 1971, the publisher was bought by the Canadian company Harlequin Enterprises, its North American distributor based in Toronto, with whom it had a long informal partnership. The two companies offer a number of imprints that between them account for almost three-quarters of the romance paperbacks published in Britain. Its print books are presently out-numbered and out-sold by the company's e-books, which allowed the publisher to double its output.

Modern Mills & Boon novels, over 100 of which are released each month, cover a wide range of possible romantic subgenres, varying in explicitness, setting and style, although retaining a comforting familiarity that meets reader expectations.

History

Mills & Boon was founded by Gerald Rusgrove Mills (3 January 1877 – 23 September 1928) and Charles Boon (9 May 1877 – 2 December 1943) in 1908 as a general fiction publisher, although their first book was, prophetically, a romance. An early signing was the mystery and crime writer Victor Bridges. Mills & Boon also published—in 1911 and 1912—two early works by Hugh Walpole, including the very successful Mr Perrin and Mr Traill (which was subsequently filmed). Between 1912 and 1923, it published numerous adventure titles by Jack London. In its early years the company also published "educational textbooks, socialist tracts and Shakespeare" as well as "travel guides, children’s and craft books".

It was not until the 1930s that the company began to concentrate specifically on romances. The company was purchased on 1 October 1971, by Harlequin Enterprises of Canada, their North American distributor.

From the very beginning, Mills & Boon published in a form and at a price that was within the reach of a wide readership. In the 1930s the company noted the rapid rise of commercial circulating libraries and the growing appetite for escapism during the Depression years. Due to these type of libraries, Mills & Boon were able to produce over 160 titles every year during that decade. Historian Ross McKibbin has argued that 'it was the rapid growth of the ‘tuppenny libraries’ in the interwar years which transformed Mills and Boon into a firm which exclusively published romantic fiction.' The favourite genre was romance and the company decided to concentrate on hardback romances, a policy which became increasingly successful.  These titles were initially sold through weekly, two-penny libraries. There, they became known as 'the brown books', because of their distinctive binding.

Mills & Boon's innovative marketing strategies also contributed to their novels' popularity. Since 1930, this was evident when the company sent a copy of a chapter (a souvenir chapter) of one of their books to whoever formally requested one. Furthermore, the company's innovative marketing extended to creating eye-catching covers (with attention-grabbing colours and "and romantic images of couples or the beautiful heroine") to display in store windows.

During World War II, Mills & Boon created ads that notified the public that they could go to their bookseller and place a standing order on any of their books. This guaranteed that Mills & Boons would always keep their novels in stock in bookstores, despite the challenges to businesses (such as shortages) that resulted from the war. This marketing technique also created a sense of urgency, due to an implication that there was a limited supply for whoever didn't place a standing order. These ads significantly contributed to the company's expansion.

With the decline of commercial lending libraries in the late 1950s, the company's most profitable move was to realise that there would remain a strong market for romance novels, but that sales would depend on readers having easy access to reasonably priced books. As a result, Mills & Boon romance became widely available from newsagents across the country. Also, beginning in 1958, they made an agreement with Harlequin in Canada to sell reprints of Mills & Boon titles, giving the firm access to the North American market and to make a major move into paperback publishing. Mills & Boon did not publish in paperback until the 1960s, most of its books were sold not to individuals but to commercial libraries.

In 1971, the Boon family sold the company to Harlequin Enterprises of Canada. Harlequin, having made a great success out of selling licensed Mills & Boon titles in North America, wanted to secure the editorial source. John Boon, son of the co-founder, continued as head of the company while his brother, Alan, continued as head of editorial. Much of the company's success from the 1950s to the 1980s came from Alan Boon's editorial talent.

A considerable portion of Mills & Boon sales were derived from export markets, particularly India, South Africa, Australia, New Zealand and the Philippines. In 1976, an Australian office was established in Sydney to handle sales in the Asia-Pacific region. The success of the Australian operation in the 1970s was such that it was able to begin printing its own editions.

In 1989, Mills & Boon product sampled over 700,000 of their novels to East German women who were newly liberated from the Soviet Union (see Fall of the Berlin Wall). This giveaway led to the novels' popularity in eastern Germany. Within four months of that product sampling event, Mills & Boon's books were sold on newsstands throughout the region; in 2 years they "gained market share in Poland, sold six-and-a-half million romance novels in Hungary, and achieved $10 million in sales in the Czech Republic."

Their books are sold through a combination of subscription and retail sales. For example, in any given month they publish eight novels in their Modern line; six of those are available on the retail market, and all eight are available to buy directly from the company both on and offline. Mills & Boon encourage readers to subscribe to their favorite lines, whose books will then be delivered to their home.

One distinctive feature of both Mills & Boon and Harlequin (in North America) is the length of time their books are available to buy. They publish a set number of books each month which are sent to subscribers and displayed on stands in book shops. At the end of the month, any unsold copies in the shops are withdrawn and pulped. Titles are available to buy direct from Mills & Boon for 3 months or until they are sold out, whichever is sooner. Again, any remaining books are disposed of. Fans looking for particular books after this time must find them second-hand.

Mills & Boon has over 3 million regular readers in the UK annually. Romantic fiction constitutes the largest section of the adult paperback fiction market and Harlequin Mills & Boon publishes series fiction, promotional titles, gift packs and single titles under different brands and imprints: Mills & Boon, and Mira.

As of 2008, 200 million Mills & Boon novels were sold globally per annum and, in the United Kingdom, one paperback was sold on average every 6.6 seconds. Mills & Boon accounted for nearly three-quarters of the British romantic fiction market in that year.

Outside the UK, Mills & Boon novels were officially launched in India in 2008, although they were already popular in the country due to unofficial imports and purchases from abroad. Sales swiftly increased, doubling over the 2009–2010 period.

According to Mills & Boon, an author can receive royalties of between £2,000 to £30,000 per book.

Centenary year
The year 2008 was Mills & Boon's centenary as a publisher. This was marked by a number of events and exhibitions. In November 2008, BBC Four celebrated the anniversary by broadcasting the 90-minute drama Consuming Passion, written by Emma Frost.

Electronic publishing
Electronic publishing has allowed Mills & Boon to double its output. As of 2012, it now releases over 100 e-books per month, more than in print, and sells more e-books than physical books. Parent company Torstar cited the strong growth of e-books in its 2010 report, with digital revenues up CAN$16.1 Million.

According to Tim Cooper, digital and marketing director for the publisher, "digital lends itself to the habitual nature of our content. Our readers finish reading one and they can download the next." Author Sharon Kendrick's opinion is similar: "[Mills & Boon] are an intense reading experience, and they can be read quickly. People read four to five in a few days so that's a lot of books to carry around."

Another factor in favour of electronic publishing is the lack of a visible cover. Cooper notes that "part of the appeal of digital reading is that nobody necessarily knows what you're reading." Kendrick supports this view as well, saying, "one of the things about reading romance is that slightly furtive thing, the 'oh God, I can't be seen on the train reading a romance'. If you've got a Kindle then no one knows what you're reading. It's not about embarrassment, really—it's more that you don't want to be judged, and we are often judged by what we read."

The more sexually explicit Spice imprint sells particularly well in electronic format, compared to the Modern imprint which is the most successful in print.

Critical opinion
The company has been criticised for repeating plots, the inevitability of their happy endings, and a simple writing style, whereas fans cite predictability as a key reason for reading.

While there is no template or standard outline and authors are allowed full artistic freedom, there are, however, genre conventions that need to be met to be successful. Penny Jordan, an author writing for Mills & Boon, has stated that "[the rules] are not written down, but if you diverge from reader expectations, they won't read your second book."

In popular imagination and feminist criticism, the heroine of a stereotypical Mills & Boon novel is often seen as a passive virgin who is submissive to the hero in every way. This was often true in older novels but changed over the years; modern novels feature more active protagonists. Mills & Boon heroines cover a wide variety of types, often depending on the author's preference. Romantic encounters were embodied in a principle of sexual purity that demonstrated not only social conservatism, but also how heroines could control their personal autonomy.

The attributes of the heroes of Mills & Boon novels have not significantly changed over time, however, almost always being a dominant alpha male. Joanna Bowring, co-curator of the Mills & Boon centenary exhibition at Manchester Central Library in 2008, notes that "there's always been a subtle undercurrent of force throughout the books and that's never changed from the earliest ones. Even later, when other aspects are influenced by feminism and the shifting attitudes outside the novel, the men are masterful and stern." In 1966, the Mills & Boon author Hilary Wilde said "The odd thing is that if I met one of my heroes, I would probably bash him over the head with an empty whisky bottle. It is a type I loathe and detest. I imagine in all women, deep down inside us, is a primitive desire to be arrogantly bullied." Many critics point to the comments by another of Mills & Boon's writers, Violet Winspear, in 1970, that all her heroes "must frighten and fascinate. They must be the sort of men who are capable of rape". Bindel argues that, as heroines have acquired greater agency, the heroes have become even more domineering and misogynistic. Other critics contend that these characters are outdated and inappropriate for modern works. However, supporters of the publisher counter that Mills & Boon are careful to follow their readers' tastes and interests; if the hero follows this trend it is because that is what the readers want.

In modern novels, popular hero archetypes are Arab sheikhs, Italian billionaires, Greek tycoons, and princes. 
According to Mills & Boon author Sharon Kendrick, "the sheikh represents the ultimate female fantasy." Penny Jordan adds that the hero often has a softer side, which the heroine will discover during the course of the novel: "He's often damaged by something that's happened in his life, often to do with money. He will be more outrageous to the heroine, and harder on her. He realises he is beginning to feel, he has to resolve that conflict."

In 2011, psychologist Susan Quilliam blamed romantic fiction, and Mills & Boon in particular, for poor sexual health and relationship breakdowns. She made the claim in her paper "'He seized her in his manly arms and bent his lips to hers…'. The surprising impact that romantic novels have on our work" in the Journal of Family Planning & Reproductive Health Care published by the BMJ Group. In the paper, Quilliam writes "what we see in our [family planning clinic] consulting rooms is more likely to be informed by Mills & Boon than by the Family Planning Association." Quilliam argues that a correlation exists between negative attitudes toward the use of condoms and reading of romantic fiction; as well as citing a survey that shows only 11.5 per cent of romantic novels mention condom use. She suggests that a romance reader may "not [use] protection with a new man because she wants to be swept up by the moment as a heroine would." Among other potential problems, romantic fiction readers are also likely to have unrealistic expectations about sex, to equate lack of romance or sexual desire with a lack of love, to see pregnancy as a cure of relationship difficulties and to be less likely to terminate pregnancies. Relationships of romance readers are more likely to break down because they are likely to think that "rather than working at her relationship she should be hitching her star to a new romance." Quilliam also writes that "a deep strand of escapism, perfectionism and idealisation runs through the genre" and "if readers start to believe the story that romantic fiction offers, then they store up trouble for themselves–and then they bring that trouble into our consulting rooms."

Imprints

Current
Mills & Boon currently publish several imprints. Several titles are published monthly in most imprints. These are all identifiable by a series title (and sometimes sub-series title) as well as a colour border (which differs depending on the country in which the title is published):

 By Request: Reissues of novels from the Modern or Romance series. Introduced in 1995.
 Dare: Sexually explicit novels akin to the former Blaze series. Introduced in 2018.
 Desire: Sexual novels featuring couples in a contemporary setting with dramatic plots. For many years, the Desire imprint only featured two-in-one books. Introduced in the 1980s as a Silhouette imprint and became a Mills and Boon imprint in 2007.
 Historical: Romance mixed with historical fiction. (e.g. Romance in 1920s New York or 17th century England.) Formerly called Masquerade (1977–1993), Legacy of Love (1993–1996) and Historical Romance (1996–2007).
 Heroes: Thrilling stories mainly about survival and suspense. Introduced in 2013 and formally known as Romantic Suspense (2013–2018)
 Heartwarming: Books that celebrate traditional values and love. Introduced in 2018.
 Love Inspired: Books about faith, hope and the power of love itself. Introduced in 2018.
 Modern: Novels focus on glamorous and 'sophisticated' passionate romance in international locations. Featuring intense relationships, often very sexual, often reflecting shared feelings and desires. Introduced in 2000 and formally known as Modern Romance.
 Medical: Contemporary romances set against the background of the medical profession. Introduced in 1977 and formally known as Doctor Nurse Romance (1977–1989), Love on Call (1993-1996) and Medical Romance (1989–1993, 1996–2007, 2010–2018).
 True Love: Warm and emotional novels that focus on capturing the feeling of falling in love. Introduced in 2018.
 Special Releases: Includes seasonal collections and reissue anthologies.
 Supernatural: Stories focusing on the paranormal romance. Introduced in 2018, replacing Intrigue.

e-book only imprints
 Vintage: Backlist titles from the Modern. Desire and Historical imprints published in e-book format.
 American Romance: themed around classically American heroes such as cowboys. e-book only.
 Historical Undone: shorter length historical editorial of greater sensuality in general than the Historical series. e-book only.
 Kimani: African-American romances. e-book only.
 Love Inspired: Inspirational romance. e-book only.
 Love Inspired Suspense: Inspirational romance containing themes of intrigue or thriller titles. e-book only.
 Love Inspired Historical: Inspirational romance containing historical themes and settings. e-book only. 
 Nocturne Cravings: shorter length titles dealing with darker and paranormal themes. e-book only.

Defunct

Blaze: Very sexual novels featuring couples in contemporary romantic relationships. Introduced in 2001 as a supplement series to the Sensual Romance imprint, with the latter being folded into Blaze in 2005. Imprint itself was discontinued in 2015.
 Cherish: Warm and emotional novels that focus on capturing the feeling of falling in love. Introduced in 2010 after the merger of the Special Moments and Romance lines and discontinued in 2018.
 Duet: Reissues combining two novels by the same author in one volume. Formally called The Best Of (1983–1986) and Collection (1986–1992). Introduced in 1983 and as merged with the Favourites imprint to become By Request in 1995.
 Enchanted: Mystery themed series. It partially replaced the long running Romance imprint in 1996 and was itself replaced by Tender Romance in 2000.
 Favourites: Reissues of best selling books. Formally called Classics (1977–1981) and Best Seller Romance (1981–1993). Launched in 1995 and was merged with the Duet imprint to become By Request in 1995.
 Harlequin Love Affair: UK version of the Harlequin American Romance imprint used in the United States. It was introduced in 1984 and was replaced with the Silhouette Sensation imprint in 1988.
 Intrigue: Romance mixed with the suspense or thriller genre. Originally introduced as a Silhouette imprint in 1994 and was discontinued in 2018.
 Modern Extra: A sister series to Modern. Formally called Modern Romance Extra (2004–2007). Introduced in 2004 and was replaced by Modern Heat in 2008.
 Modern Tempted: Novels aimed at younger readers. Formally known as Modern Heat (2008–2010) and Riva (2010–2013). Introduced in 2008 and discontinued in 2015.
 Nocturne: Paranormal romance imprint, mixing romance with genres such as horror, science fiction and fantasy. Originally introduced as Intrigue Nocturne in 2008 and was split into its own series in 2010. Discontinued in 2018.
 Packs: Three to four books released in a slipcase.
 Presents: Partially replaced the long running Romance imprint in 1996, carrying the more explicit titles from that imprint. It was replaced by Modern Romance in 2000.
 Tender Romance Replaced Enchanted in 2000 and replaced with (New) Romance in 2006.
 Sensation UK version of the Silhouette American Romance and Romantic Suspense Imprints. Introduced in 1988 and was folded into the Intrigue line in 2007, after the Silhouette Books name was retired in the UK.
 Romance: The oldest running imprint. It split into the Presents and Enchanted imprints in Autumn 1996. It was revived in September 2006.
 Spotlight A Reissue series from past Silhouette books. Introduced in 2003 and was merged and folded into the By Request imprint in 2011.
 Sensual Romance: Replaced the Temptation imprint in 2000. It was merged into Blaze in 2005.
 SuperRomance: Introduced as a Silhouette imprint in 2001 and was merged with Special Edition to make Special Moments in 2009.
 Spice: Erotic fiction imprint, featuring casual sex and bondage. The most explicit imprint published by Mills & Boon. Introduced around 2009 and was retired in 2015.
 Special Edition: UK version of the US imprint. Introduced as a Silhouette imprint in 1983 and was merged with Special Edition to make Special Moments in 2009.
 Special Moments: Replaced Special Edition and SuperRomance in 2009 and merged with (new) Romance to make Cherish in 2010.
 (New) Romance: Replaced Tender Romance in 2006 and merged with Special Moments to create Cherish in 2010.

See also
 Lawrence Heisey

References

Further reading

McAleer, Joseph (1992). Popular Reading and Publishing in Britain: 1914–1950, Oxford University Press.

External links

Mills & Boon official website
Official website Mills & Boon Australia
A fine romance: a history of Mills & Boon, reading.ac.uk.
 Mills & Boon - Archive and Library - University of Reading

Book publishing companies of the United Kingdom
Romance book publishing companies
Publishing companies established in 1908
News Corporation subsidiaries
1908 establishments in the United Kingdom
Harlequin Enterprises